Varvarino is a rural locality (a selo) in Nordovsky Selsoviet, Meleuzovsky District, Bashkortostan, Russia. The population was 188 as of 2010. There are 3 streets.

Geography 
Varvarino is located 48 km northwest of Meleuz (the district's administrative centre) by road. Dmitriyevka is the nearest rural locality.

References 

Rural localities in Meleuzovsky District